Pole to Pole is a book written by Michael Palin to accompany his BBC television series Pole to Pole.

Book contents

The book follows each of his seven trips made for the BBC, consisting of both his text and of many photographs to illustrate the trip. Most of the pictures in this book were taken by Basil Pao, the stills photographer who was part of the expedition team.

The book chronicles the journey in five chapters:

The North Pole to Tallinn - The Arctic, Greenland, Norway, Finland, USSR
Tallinn to Port Said - USSR, Turkey, Rhodes, Cyprus, Egypt
Port Said to Nairobi - Egypt, Sudan, Ethiopia, Kenya
Nairobi to Cape Town - Kenya, Tanzania, Zambia, Zimbabwe, South Africa
Cape Town to the South Pole - South Africa, Chile, Antarctica

The demonstration of the Coriolis effect in Kenya was, apparently, a clever hoax.

Audio edition 
This book is available as an audiobook, read by Michael Palin. There are two versions available.  The abridged version lasts 5 hours, 40 minutes and the unabridged version 10 hours, 15 minutes.

Photograph book
Basil Pao produced an accompaniment called Pole to Pole - The Photographs.

References

External links
 Full text of the book on Michael Palin's official website.

British travel books
1992 non-fiction books
Books by Michael Palin
English non-fiction books